The Saryu Express is an Express train belonging to North Central Railway zone that runs between Prayag Ghat and  in India. It is currently being operated with 14233/14234 train numbers on a daily basis.

Service

The 14233/Saryu Express has an average speed of 30 km/hr and covers 203 km in 6h 50m. The 14234/Saryu Express has an average speed of 34 km/hr and covers 203 km in  5h 55m.

Route and halts 

The important halts of the train are

Coach composition

The train has standard ICF rakes with max speed of 110 kmph. The train consists of 17 coaches:

 8 General Un-Reserved
 2 Seating cum Luggage Rake

Schedule

Running Days : Daily

Traction

Both trains are hauled by a Lucknow Loco Shed or Gonda Loco Shed-based WDM-3A diesel locomotive from Prayag Ghat to Mankapur and vice versa.

Rake sharing

Trainshares its rake with 54110/54109 Mughalsarai–Faizabad Passenger

See also 

 Allahabad Junction railway station
 Mankapur Junction railway station
 Mughalsarai–Faizabad Passenger

Notes

References

External links 

 14233/Saryu Express
 14234/Saryu Express

Trains from Allahabad
Named passenger trains of India
Express trains in India